Ever Shipping Lines Inc. is a company based in Zamboanga City with four ships, MV Ever Queen of Asia, MV Ever Queen Emilia, MV Ever Sweet and MV Rosalinda. They operate routes from Zamboanga City to Bongao, Tawi-Tawi, and Zamboanga City to Olutanga, Zamboanga Sibugay.

History 
Ever Shipping Lines was founded in the early 1970s by entrepreneur Faustino Saavedra founded Ever Trading in Zamboanga. By mid 1970s, the operations of the company expanded with the increase of the volume of products being handled by Ever trading. The management of the company decided to acquire its own transport facility became out of necessity. In 1975, Ever trading acquired its first cargo and passenger vessel. Saavedra, on the same year established Ever Lines, Inc. to augment distribution capabilities.

In February 2006, Ever Lines, introduced Phil National Lines, Inc. as their subsidiary. Phil National Lines is a company that is engaged in tanker business to serve Petroleum Companies under the supervision of Cargomarine Corporation.

In 2008, Faustino Saavedra was shot dead by two gunmen aboard on a motorcycle. He with his wife Floria Saavedra, was cruising Mayor Jaldon street in Canelar, Zamboanga City when this happen. It was believed that the gunmen were looking into extortion as a possible motive in the killing.

After Saavedra's lost, his wife and their family continued this shipping line business so as with the Ever Trading. However, it also resulted to Ever Shipping Lines Inc. to decline their operations by reducing their fleet, routes, and manpower.

Ports of Call 
Their ships' port of call is registered at the Port of Zamboanga according to Maritime Industry Authority.

Routes 
Current
Their available routes as of 2016:
 Zamboanga City - Bongao, Tawi-Tawi
 Zamboanga City - Olutanga - Malangas

Former
Former routes of Ever Shipping Lines that is now left abandoned after reducing their fleets:
Zamboanga City - Jolo

Fleet 
Ever Shipping Lines had 6 ships in 2013. As of 2016, the number of ships operated by the company is down to 4.

Current vessels

Former vessels
 MV Ever Queen of Hope
 MV Ever Queen of Pacific (also named as MV Ever Queen of Pacific 1)
 MV Ever Transport (until 2010)

Subsidiaries 
 Ever Trading
 Phil National Lines, Inc.
 Cargormarine Corporation

See also 
 List of shipping companies in the Philippines
 2GO Travel
 Aleson Shipping Lines Inc.
 Weesam Express
 Cokaliong Shipping Lines
 Montenegro Shipping Lines

References

External links 
 EVER SHIPPING LINES Contact Information - Lonely Planet
 Ever Shipping Lines Inc. - History

Ferry companies of the Philippines
Shipping companies of the Philippines
Transportation in Mindanao
Companies based in Zamboanga City